Juan Mónaco defeated Gaël Monfils 7–6(7–3), 6–0 to win the 2007 Hypo Group Tennis International singles event.

Seeds

Draws

Finals

Top half

Bottom half

External links
Singles Draw
Singles Qualifying Draw

Singles
2007 ATP Tour